Harith Iskander bin Musa (born 7 August 1966) is a Malaysian actor and comedian. He is considered to be "the Godfather of Stand-Up Comedy" in Malaysia, having also won the Asia's Best Stand-Up Comedian Award 2014 by Top 10 of Asia Magazine.

He won the Funniest Person in the World competition in December 2016.

Early life 
Iskander was raised in Johor Bahru in the state of Johore. His father, Musa Ibrahim hailed from the state and was of Malay descent. His mother, Jane Musa was of Scottish ancestry from the Grant clan, working in the United Nations Headquarters in New York City as a secretary. They both met in the Democratic Republic of Congo during the Congo Crisis, Musa being a member of the peacekeeping corps sent by the Malaysian government there while Jane worked as part of the UN staff.

He attended Curtin University in Perth, Australia, majoring in journalism and obtained a Bachelor of Arts in English. He graduated in 1988

During his university and young adult days, Iskander made a conscious decision to embrace Australian culture while he was an international student despite his aversion to study. For example, his curiosity led him to trying the sport of cricket. On another occasion, Iskander described a time where he entered an adult shop in Australia after arriving from Malaysia, only to find out that the shop was full of Malaysian students.

Career 
Iskander's career in stand-up comedy began during 1990 or 1991, when he was persuaded by a university friend to get on stage in the old Subang Airport Hotel lobby lounge to tell some funny stories. It was at this lounge where a member of the audience saw Iskander and invited him to another function to perform on-stage.

In 2016, Iskander was one of 89 international stand-up comedians nominated for Laugh Factory's Funniest Person in the World. Iskander has been announced as an ambassador for Culture and Tourism Malaysia by Datuk Seri Nazri Aziz (Tourism and Culture Minister) as he is now one of the attraction in Malaysia.

After being crowned as the Laugh Factory's Funniest Person in the World in 2016, in 2017, Iskander curated the Kuala Lumpur International Comedy Festival (KLICFest 2017) which considered by many to be Asia's best comedy showcase. The festival programme featured performances from the finest Malaysian acts, the biggest international stars and one local legend offering both English and Bahasa Malaysia comedy.

Thereafter the kick-off show (KLICFest) in Kuala Lumpur, in 2018, Harith Iskander, in partnership with Celcom, had tour his home ground again to deliver the laughs – the #KitaOK Live Comedy Tour 2018. The tour started off in Kuala Lumpur before showing at six other cities in Malaysia: including Johor, Malacca, Penang, Kuching, Kota Kinabalu and Labuan. Harith Iskander also succeeded in putting Malaysia on the comedy map the second time by releasing his Netflix original comedy special, I Told You So in 2018.

Apart from that in 2018, Harith held his Australia tour named Harith Iskander The Tour - Melbourne International Comedy Festival 2018, Adelaide Fringe 2018 and Perth Fringe 2018. Besides, Harith tickled the audiences in the City Of Angels (Los Angeles) in June 2017 where the organizer was The Laugh Factory.

Comedic philosophy 
Iskander's view of comedy is that the best comedians are the most authentic comedians; that is to say, a good comedian does not become someone they are not just because they are on a stage. Iskander describes his comedy as 'totally observational and personal', filled with personal experience. He describes himself as 'not a shock comedian', but one who has his own 'personal barriers'; for example, one area in which he 'treads carefully' is the subject matter of politics. He notes that Malaysian comedy tends to be 'casually racist' sometimes.

Iskander's source of jokes come from everywhere around him and he is an advocate of cross-border relations between Singaporean and Malaysian comedians.

Personal life 
On 12 June 2010, Iskander married doctor and FHM model Jezamine Lim after meeting her through Facebook.

Filmography

Film

Television

Other appearances 
Iskander has also appeared in various comedy sittings such as The Kings and Queens of Comedy Asia and the Best of Comedy Malaysia at Lower Town Hall, Melbourne.

References

External links 
 

1966 births
Living people
People from Johor Bahru
Malaysian people of Malay descent
Malaysian people of British descent
Malaysian people of Scottish descent
Malaysian Muslims
Malaysian stand-up comedians
Malaysian male actors
Malaysian comedians
Curtin University alumni
21st-century comedians